= Scherer, Nabholz & Co. =

19th century Russian photography company

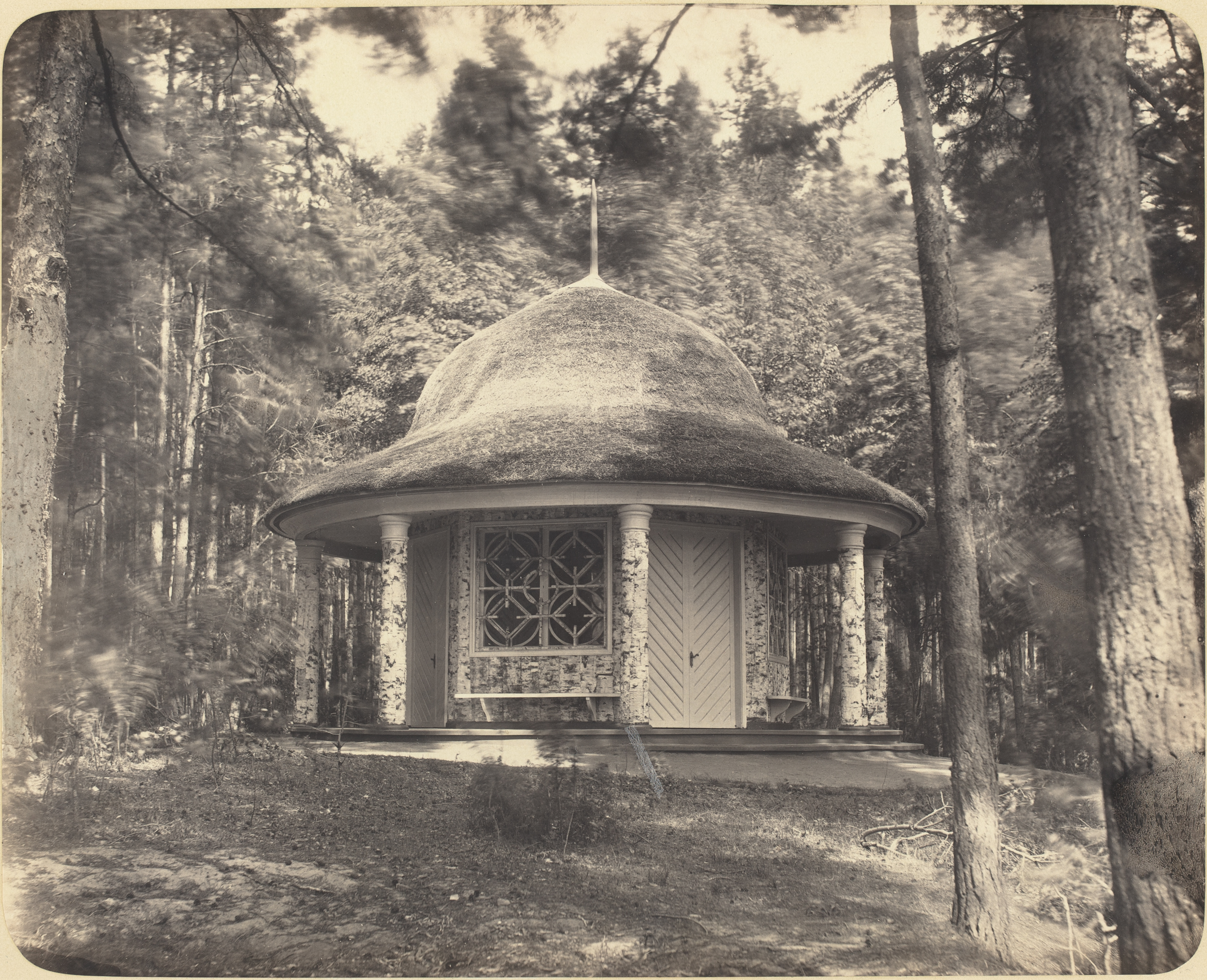
Scherer and Nabholz, Gazebo in the Forest Near Moscow, c. 1870s.

Scherer, Nabholz & Co. was a 19th century Russian photography company formed by immigrants Martin Scherer from Baden and Gottlieb (Georgy) Nabholz from Switzerland in the 1860s in Moscow.

The company was known for its production of photographic postcards. Their work is included in the collections of the Museum of Fine Arts Houston, the National Gallery of Art, Washington, the British Museum, London, the State Russian Museum and the Royal Collection Trust, London.

== Gallery ==
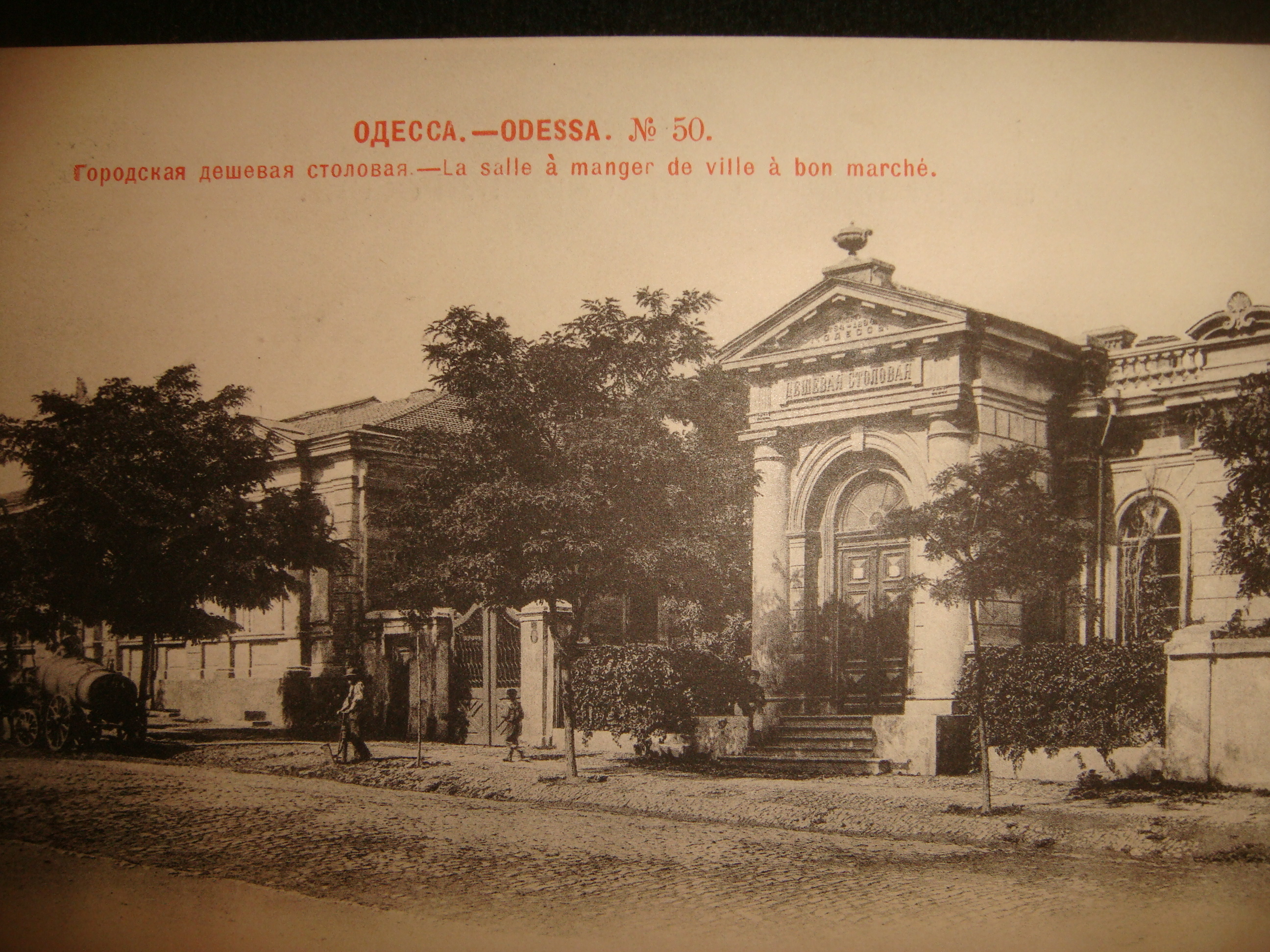
Photo Post Card with view of Odessa published by Phototypie Scherer, Nabholz & Co, Moscow at the beginning of 20th century

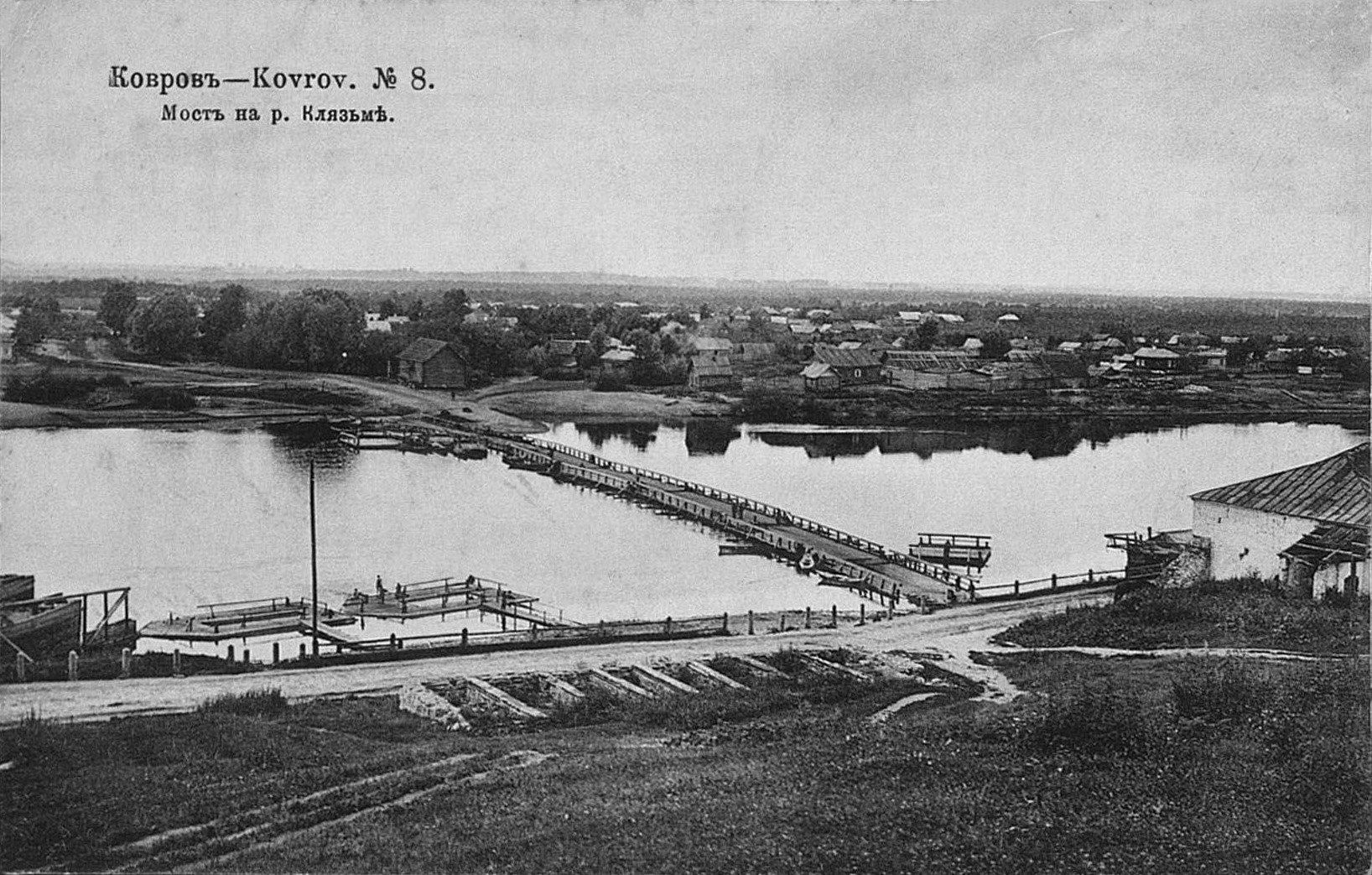
Bridge on the Klyazma River, Russia 1904.

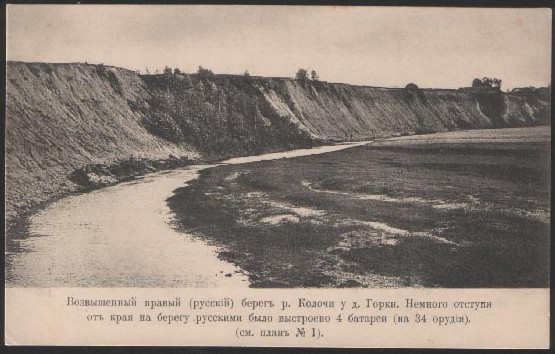
Pre-1917 Russian postcard printed by Sherer, Nabgoltz & Co., Moscow, before 1917 and showing the shore of the Koloch River, close to the village of Gorki.

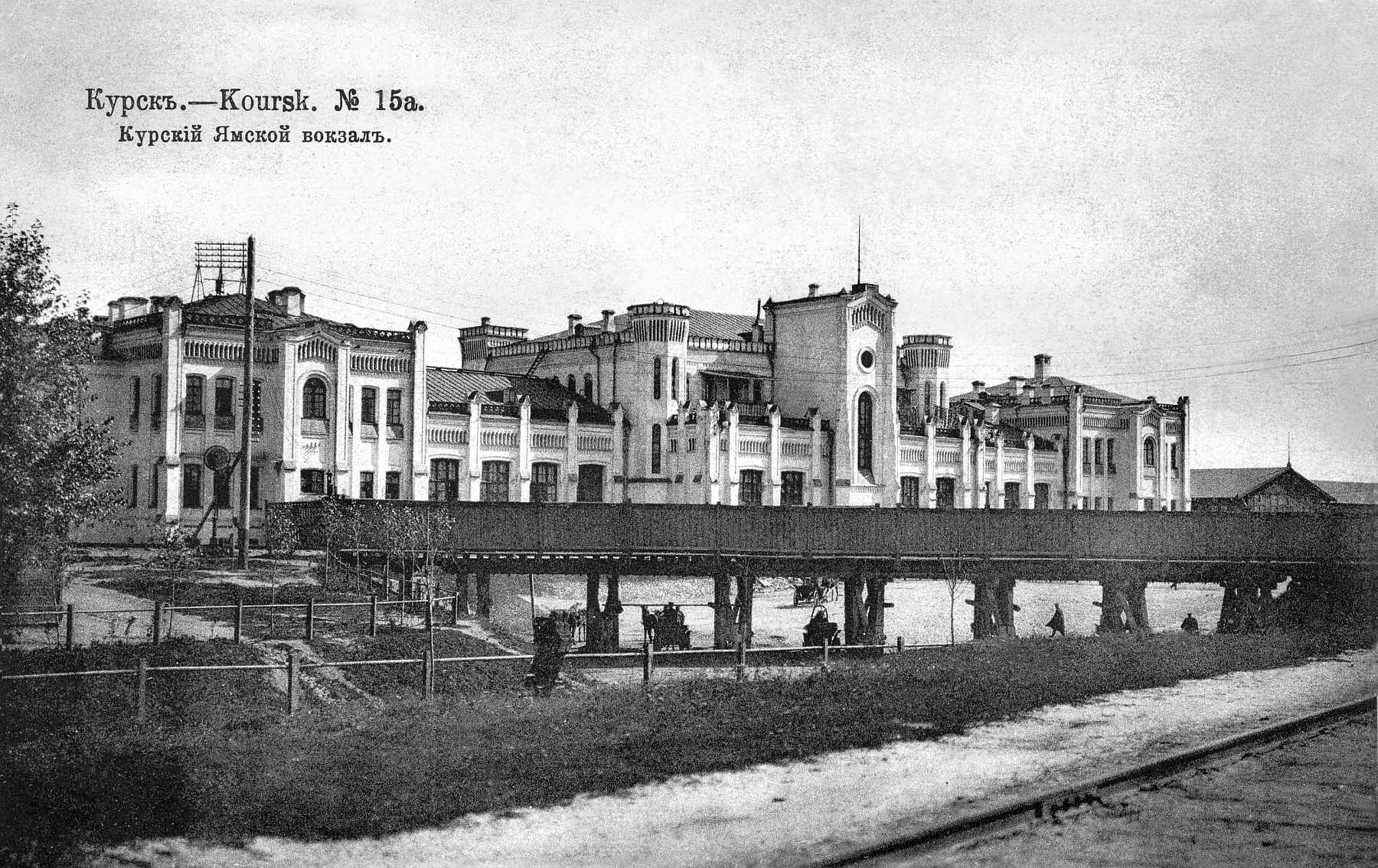
Old Kursk Train Station (Yamskoy Vokzal, Kursk I) in the beginning of XX century. Circa 1915.
